In organometallic chemistry, a dicarbollide is an anion of the formula [C2B9H11]2-.  Various isomers exist, but most common is 1,2-dicarbollide derived from ortho-carborane.  These dianions function as ligands, related to the cyclopentadienyl anion.  Substituted dicarbollides are also known such as [C2B9H10(pyridine)]− (pyridine bonded to B) and [C2R2B9H9]2- (R groups bonded to carbon).

Synthesis of dicarbollides
Dicarbollides are obtained by base-degradation of 12-vertex dicarboranes.  This degradation of the ortho derivative has been most heavily studied.  The conversion is conducted in two-steps, first "deboronation" and second deprotonation:

C2B10H12  +  NaOEt  +  2 EtOH  →  Na+C2B9H12−  +  H2  +  B(OEt)3
Na+C2B9H12−  +  NaH  →  Na2C2B9H11  +  H2

The dianion derived from ortho-carborane, [C2B9H11]2- is a nido cluster.  The nomenclature rules call the high coordination number vertex as 1.  Thus the nido cluster with two adjacent carbon centers on the rim is the 7,8-isomer.

Coordination compounds

A variety of complexes - a subset of metallaborane - are known with one or two dicarbollide ligands.  An example of a 1:1 complex is [Mn(CO)3(η5-7,8-C2B9H11)]−.

Most heavily studied are complexes with two dicarbollide ligands, especially sandwich complexes. Thus, these are prepared by salt metathesis reactions, as illustrated by the synthesis of the ferrocene  analogue:
2 Na2C2B8H11  +  FeCl2  →   Na2[Fe(C2B8H11)2]  +  2 NaCl

These bisdicarbollide dianions are often readily oxidized. Fe(III), Co(III), Ni(III), and Ni(IV) derivatives are known.  In some cases, the oxidation induces rearrangement of the C2B9 cage to give complexes where the carbon centers are nonadjacent.

Precursor to other carboranes
Diprotonation of [C2B9H11]2− gives the neutral carborane C2B9H13.  Pyrolysis of this nido cluster gives closo-C2B9H11.  Chromate-oxidation of [C2B9H12]− results in deboronation, giving the C2B7H13. This carborane features two CH2 vertices.

Homogeneous catalysis

The clam-shell dicarbollide complex (Cp*)(C2B9H11)ZrCH3 catalyzes alkene polymerization.

References

Organoboron compounds
Cluster chemistry